Graeme Wayne Rutjes (born 26 March 1960 in Sydney, Australia) is a former Australian-born Dutch footballer, who played as a defender for Excelsior Rotterdam (1980–85), Y.R. K.V. Mechelen (1985–90) and R.S.C. Anderlecht (1990–96).

Rutjes played 13 matches and scored 1 goal for the Netherlands national football team from 1989 to 1991, and was a member of the Dutch team for the 1990 FIFA World Cup.

Honours

Player 
KV Mechelen

 Belgian First Division: 1988–89
 Belgian Cup: 1986–87 (winners), 1990-91 (runners-up), 1991-92 (runners-up)
 European Cup Winners Cup: 1987–88 (winners)
 European Super Cup: 1988
 Amsterdam Tournament: 1989
Joan Gamper Trophy: 1989
 Jules Pappaert Cup: 1990

RSC Anderlecht

 Belgian First Division: 1990–91, 1992–93, 1993–94, 1994–95
 Belgian Cup: 1993–94
 Belgian Super Cup: 1993, 1995

References

Graeme Rutjes' Profile 

1960 births
Living people
Dutch footballers
Netherlands international footballers
1990 FIFA World Cup players
Excelsior Rotterdam players
K.V. Mechelen players
R.S.C. Anderlecht players
Soccer players from Sydney
Eredivisie players
Belgian Pro League players
Expatriate footballers in Belgium
Dutch expatriate sportspeople in Belgium
Australian people of Dutch descent
Association football defenders